Walterio Airport  is a rural airport  south of the coastal city of Monte Cristi, Dominican Republic. It serves private aviation and air sports.
Now with the Osvaldo Virgil Airport replacing most of its operations, this airport has been reverted as only a runway.

The Cap Haitien VOR/DME

See also

Transport in Dominican Republic
List of airports in Dominican Republic

References

External links
OpenStreetMap - Walterio Airport
SkyVector - Walterio Airport
OurAirports - Walterio Airport

Airports in the Dominican Republic
Buildings and structures in Monte Cristi Province